Michael John Barrett (born June 27, 1948, in Agana, Guam) is a Massachusetts politician noted for having been elected to serve in three completely different state legislative districts over the course of his political career.  At present he is the state senator for the 3rd Middlesex District of Massachusetts. Barrett served in the State Senate earlier, in 1987–1994, representing another district (Cambridge, Belmont, Watertown and the Allston-Brighton neighborhood of Boston), before moving to his present home in suburban Lexington in 1996. Even earlier, in 1979–1985, he served in the Massachusetts House of Representatives from a district comprising Reading, North Reading and a portion of Wilmington.

Early life
Barrett, the second oldest in a family of ten children, graduated from Reading (MA) High School in 1966, Harvard College magna cum laude in 1970, and Northeastern University School of Law in 1977, after which he clerked for the U,S. District Court in Washington, DC

State Representative
Barrett was elected to the Massachusetts House of Representatives in 1978. He ran for a seat in the United States House of Representatives in 1984, losing the Democratic primary in the Massachusetts's 7th congressional district to Ed Markey.

State Senate
In 1990, during his first stint as state senator, Barrett wrote an Atlantic Monthly cover story in which he advocated a longer school day and year for American students. A year later, he was named one of nine commissioners on the National Education Commission on Time and Learning, created by the U.S. Congress to examine the issues raised in the Atlantic article.

In 1992 Barrett drafted and saw through to enactment domestic violence legislation for Massachusetts that was precedent-setting in the United States, in that it required judges to consult a comprehensive computerized registry of offenders before they ruled on requests for restraining orders. He was also successful as lead sponsor of major environmental legislation regulating uses of toxic materials in manufacturing within the state.

Private sector
In 1994 Barrett ran unsuccessfully for Governor of Massachusetts. Departing the state senate the following year, he was named CEO and general counsel of the Visiting Nurse Associations of New England, a large home health care provider network. Several years later, he embarked on a consulting career focused on the emergence of the Internet and the development of online services involved in health care.

Return to Senate
In December 2011, after a 16-year absence from politics, Barrett announced his candidacy for state senate in the 3rd Middlesex District. In September 2012 he won the Democratic nomination after an intensely contested five-candidate race. He went on to beat Republican nominee Sandra Martinez in the November 6th general election. The 3rd Middlesex District covers nine communities: Bedford, Carlisle, Chelmsford, Concord, Lexington (precincts 3, 8 and 9), Lincoln, Sudbury (precincts 1, 4 and 5), Waltham and Weston.

In January 2013 Barrett was named Senate Chair of the Joint Committee on Children, Families and Persons with Disabilities. In 2015 Barrett was named chair of the Senate Post-Audit and Oversight Committee, a unique body charged with overseeing implementation of all state programs run by the governor and his appointees.  In 2017 he was appointed Senate Chair of the Joint Committee on Telecommunications, Utilities & Energy. The committee's jurisdiction covers everything from cell phones to alternative energy to public utility reform to carbon pricing.

Personal life
Barrett lives in Lexington with his wife. They have twin daughters.

See also
 1987–1988 Massachusetts legislature
 1989–1990 Massachusetts legislature
 2019–2020 Massachusetts legislature
 2021–2022 Massachusetts legislature

References

External links
 Legislative website
 State House website
 Campaign website

1948 births
Harvard College alumni
Democratic Party Massachusetts state senators
Democratic Party members of the Massachusetts House of Representatives
Northeastern University School of Law alumni
Politicians from Cambridge, Massachusetts
People from Hagåtña, Guam
Living people
Lawyers from Cambridge, Massachusetts
21st-century American politicians
American health care chief executives
People from Lexington, Massachusetts